Highways in Slovakia are divided into motorways and expressways.

The majority of these dual carriageways are managed by the state-owned National Motorway Company of Slovakia (NDS), established in 2005. The first modern highway in Slovakia should have been built in the 1930s. The planned motorway would have connected Prague with northern Slovakia. However, the construction of Slovak motorways did not begin until the 1970s.

NDS currently manages and maintains 854 km (530 mi) of motorways and  expressways. By the year 2030 the highway network Slovakia will be around 1,904 km.

Speed limits

History of Slovakia motorways

Before the Second World War 

The first informal plan for a motorway (first called in Czechoslovak autostráda or dálková cesta) in Czechoslovakia date back to 1935. This was to link Prague through Slovakia with the easternmost Czechoslovak territory, Carpathian Ruthenia (now Zakarpattia Oblast in Ukraine). The terminus was to be at Velykyy Bychkiv (Velký Bočkov in Czech) on the Romanian border. The definitive route, including a Prague ring motorway, was approved shortly after the Munich Agreement on 4 November 1938, with a planned speed limit of 120 km/h.

The Nazi authorities also made the second Czecho-Slovak Republic, already a German satellite state, build a part of the Reichsautobahn Breslau - Vienna as an extraterritorial German motorway with border checkpoints at each motorway exit. However, only a construction of the route within Bohemia and Moravia was initiated, but never finished. It still sporadically appears in some current Czech motorway plans.

On 1 December 1938 Nazi Germany had already initiated a construction of the so-called Sudetenautobahn (in Sudetenland, before the Munich agreement part of Czechoslovakia, then of Germany) in the route Streitau (Bavaria) – Eger – Carlsbad – Lobositz – Böhmisch Leipa – Reichenberg (capital of Sudetenland) – Görlitz (in Prussia, now in Saxony). The autobahn has never been finished, but some remnants in the landscape close to Pomezí nad Ohří, Cheb/Eger and Liberec/Reichenberg are still prominent and an unfinished part from Svárov via Machnín to Chrastava was used in the construction of the I/35 road.

Nazi occupation 
Czechoslovakia was broken up with a declaration of independence by the Slovak Republic and by the short-lived Carpatho-Ukraine which was a prelude to the German occupation of Bohemia and Moravia on 15 March 1939. It was decided to build the motorway only as far as the Slovak border. The technical parameters of motorways (speed limit of 140 – 160 km/h) were adjusted to those of the German Reichsautobahn, as Czech (Bohemian-Moravian) motorways were to be integrated within the German Reichsautobahn network.

The project for the first segment Prague - Lužná was ready in January 1939, and construction in Moravia began on 24 January in Chřiby on the Zástřizly - Lužná segment. The construction in Bohemia from Prague began on 2 May 1939, with a switch to right-hand traffic in Bohemia and Moravia having already gone without a hitch. The motorway should have reached Brno in 1940, but building materials and labour shortages due to an absolute priority given to the Nazi armament industry delayed the work considerably. The construction in the route of approx. 77 km from Prague towards Brno advanced notably, but a prohibition of all civil constructions by the German authorities came into force in 1942.

After the Second World War 
After the Second World War, the completion of only the first and unfinished 77 km of the motorway Prague – Brno as far as Humpolec was approved by the Government in November 1945 and was reinaugurated in 1946. The part-built construction sites of the Sudetenautobahn (28 km) were completely abandoned, as well as that of the Breslau – Vienna motorway (84 km). The latter was, however, incorporated in some plans as a future connection motorway between Brno and the D35 motorway. The 77 km of the Prague – Humpolec motorway had been completed except for some large bridges and a concrete surface when the new communist government decided to discontinue the work completely in early 1950.

Only on 8 August 1967 the Government of the Socialist Republic of Czechoslovakia resolved to continue the construction of motorways by adopting a new motorway plan for the whole country and resolved to continue the already twice interrupted construction of the motorway Prague - Brno (number D1) and further Brno - Bratislava (D2). The construction was solemnly inaugurated on 8 September 1967. Due to a change of technical parameters, some bridges finished before 1950 were replaced.

1990-1998 

The first post-socialist years were associated with a lack of funds for construction and problems with land settlement and ecological issues. The construction was also not benefited by its politicization. In 1990, the full profile of the section D1 Liptovský Hrádok – Hybe was completed, and a year later it was still possible to construct part of the Trenčín section (Cocholná – Skala), which had prepared documents from the communist era.

In principle, the highway network did not change even after the dissolution of the federation, the highway routes remained unchanged, it was just that the previously planned D18 highway was re-included in it, which, however, no longer headed to Český Těšín, but to the Polish border via Skalité. The stationing and numbering of roads also remained unchanged. The D1 highway near Trenčín, although it was actually at about the 20th kilometre, had a station with values ​​around the 340th kilometre.

Over time, there was also consolidation in the area of ​​highway construction, and in 1994 the construction of the second part of the Trenčín bypass (Skala - Nemšová) began, and in 1996 the missing sections between Horna Streda and Trenčín, the section Nemšová - Ladce, Hybe - Važec and Jarovce - border with Austria. During the government of Vladimír Mečiar, the opening of some (sometimes semi-profile) sections by foreign personalities (Claudia Schifferová or Gérard Depardieu) became known just before the parliamentary elections. By the end of his reign, 31.890 kilometers of full-profile highways were built in Slovakia, and 39.302 km of half-profile highways were also opened.

2006-2010 
After the inauguration of the government of Róbert Fico, it was announced that the completion of the D1 highway between Bratislava and Košice, as well as the R1 expressway between Nitra and Banská Bystrica, would be accelerated. In 2007, construction was announced through the so-called PPP projects, although a year before Fico considered them only as a last resort. The missing sections of the mentioned highways were to be built and operated for 30 years by a private individual, to whom the state would repay the costs during the entire period as part of "availability payments". Practically all the missing sections except for the left lane of the Beharovce - Branisko section and the Prešov bypass (both on D1) were divided into so-called three packages. The first included the missing sections on the D1 between Vrútki and Prešov, the second included the sections on the R1 between Nitra and Tekovské Nemce and the northern bypass of Banská Bystrica, and the third formed the southern highway bypass of Žilina together with the route I/64 (the so-called Žilina - Lietavská Lúčka feeder). All public tenders for the concessionaire were accompanied by doubts about the purposeful setting of the conditions, or the dubious exclusion of the participating consortia. In addition to the procurement process, the amount of payments was also criticized. The lack of funds and the weak willingness of the financial markets to lend money for such large-scale projects led to the constant postponement of their financial closure and thus construction. During the first government of Róbert Fico, only the so-called 2nd package.

In addition to PPP projects, the construction of other sections, mainly financed with the help of European funds, was also implemented to a limited extent. This is how the Svidník bypass on the R4, the Figa bypass on the R2, and the Horná Štubna bypass on the R3 were gradually separated. In the years 2007-2010, the long-awaited D1 section across Považská Bystrica was gradually built, thus completing the highway connection between Bratislava and Žilina. For example, the bypass of Trstena on R3 was built from the state budget.

2010 - 2015 
In 2011 the R4 between Kosice and border crossing Milhost (SK/H) was under construction making this the 5th expressway in Slovakia to connect to a border crossing (Which was completed in 2013). The R1 between Nitra and Zarnovice was fully complete which made the R1 between Trnava and Banska Bystrica fully complete. The D1 between Turany and Vrutky was complete in 2015 .

2015-present

Motorways 
Motorways in Slovakia (abbr. D) have two separated lanes in each direction, with an emergency lane on each side. The road signs are white on green. They have two lanes in each direction or some motorways are 3 or 4 lanes in each direction with smart motorway features. The speed limit of motorways through a settlement is 100 kmh (60 mph).

Expressways 

Expressways in Slovakia (abbr. R) are dual carriageways with lower standards than those of motorway, but with the same restrictions. It has the same white on green road signs as found on motorways. Expressways have a higher road curve. They have narrower lanes in some places but they can only have 2 lanes in each direction with only a few having 1 lane in each direction with an emergency lane. The speed limit of expressways through a settlement is 100 kmh (60 mph).

Toll requirements
All vehicles must have an electronic vignette to use the motorways and expressways in Slovakia. Cars, vans and motorbikes up to 3.5 tonnes only need to buy a single vignette which costs €10 for 10 days, €14 for 1 month and €50 for a year. It also applies for cars towing a trailer below 3.5 tonnes, but cars towing above 3.5 tonnes have to buy two vignettes. All vignettes are checked via  ANPR cameras or the police will pull a driver over and the driver will have to show a vignette via the E-znamka app or the driver will print out a sheet with the payment. If failing to buy a e-vignette the driver will face fines from €140 to €700.

Lorries have to buy an e-myto Via E -myto app to use the highways and expressways. There are different fares for lorries below 3.5 tonnes and lorries above 3.5 tonnes.

All the sections of motorways and expressways are toll roads except for these sections:

  BA Lamač -BA Petržalka 

   BB Juh - BB Sever

     BA Petržalka - BA Východ

See also
 Transport in Slovakia
 List of controlled-access highway systems
 Evolution of motorway construction in European nations

References

External links
 NDS official web site
 Electronic system of vignette
 Interactive map of highways
 History of highway construction in Slovakia

|}

 
Roads in Slovakia